Yupampa Valencia is a village located in La Paz Department of Bolivia.

References 

Populated places in La Paz Department (Bolivia)